Dumplington is an area of Urmston, Greater Manchester, England, which is beside Timperly.

Dumplington was one of several hamlets in the township of Barton-upon-Irwell, in the ancient ecclesiastical parish
of Eccles in the hundred of Salford. Its name derives from the Old English dympel and ing and tun which means an enclosure by a pool. The hamlet lies six miles south west of Manchester city centre.

Dumplington was recorded in the Middle Ages in 1225 in land leases between Sir Robert Grelley and Cecily, daughter of Iorwerth de Hulton and Siegrith de Dumplington. John son of Thomas de Booth was the landowner in 1401.

The Roman Catholic church of All Saints is a Grade II* listed building, designed in 1867-8 by Edward Welby Pugin.

In the late 20th century and early 21st century, there has been significant redevelopment in this area including the Trafford Centre, Trafford Waters and the extension of the Metrolink line.

References
Notes

Bibliography

Geography of Trafford
Villages in Greater Manchester